Stardust Apartments is a historical Art Deco building located is the heart of the Art Deco District of South Beach.

The Stardust is located on 910 Collins Avenue, Miami Beach FL, 33139.

References 

This property is within the Boundaries of the National Register architectural district and located within the HPD-2 Ocean Drive / Collins Avenue historic District. http://www.miamibeachfl.gov/newcity/depts/planning/Historic%20Districts%202006.pdf

External links 

 the stardust home page
 google maps and direction page

Buildings and structures in Miami Beach, Florida
Art Deco hotels
Art Deco architecture in Florida